El Gato Negro (The Black Cat) was an independent comic book series featuring the eponymous character created by Richard Dominguez and published by Azteca Productions. The series began in October 1993 with critical acclaim, the first edition actually selling all 5,000 copies within two months, but was placed on a seven-year hiatus after the fourth issue was published. Dominguez later returned in 2005 with the new series El Gato Negro: Nocturnal Warrior.

Premise
The events in "El Gato Negro" occur in South Texas, specifically within the Lower Rio Grande Valley area, where social worker Francisco "Pancho" Guerrero is motivated by the gruesome murder of his best friend by drug-traffickers, to fight crime under the guise of El Gato Negro. He is assisted in his goals by his grandfather Agustin Guerrero and several other supporting characters.

Storylines

Unknown Passing, Unforgettable Return
The first of the self-titled series published in 1993 under Dominguez's own Azteca Productions imprint. The identity El Gato Negro is in fact Francisco Guerrero, grandson of the original El Gato Negro, and heir to his legacy. Francisco adopted the identity of the El Gato Negro shortly after the murder of his friend Mario Bustamonte. Despite being popular with the citizens of his community, El Gato Negro is constantly being hunted by police Captain Miguel Bustamonte, Francisco's best friend and Mario's older brother. Miguel believes El Gato Negro is in league with the drug-smugglers that plague South Texas and was probably involved in the murder of his younger brother. While out on patrol one night as El Gato Negro, Francisco discovers two escaped convicts. Incapacitating the criminals, El Gato Negro has unknowingly stumbled across a drug-running conspiracy formed by the drug-smuggler known only as El Graduado and a mysterious South American crime organization known as The Annulus. El Gato Negro is later lured in to a trap set by El Graduado personally in an abandoned warehouse.

The Burning
(Also known as "Unknown Passing, Unforgettable Return part two") Continues immediately after the events in the first issue. In the ensuing struggle with El Graduado, El Gato Negro manages to destroy the abandoned warehouse containing large quantities of narcotics. Later Francisco discovers the identity of El Graduado to be that of Armando Ochoa, son of Ignacio Ochoa the undisputed drug lord of South Texas, a position Armando desires to take over in order to earn a seat with The Annulus.

Mexican Standoff
(Also known as "Unknown Passing, Unforgettable Return part three") The finale of the original three-part story arc. In a final confrontation with El Graduado, the villain had the upper-hand until the arrival of the original El Gato Negro and the Texas Rangers. While fleeing the scene, Armando inadvertently runs into Captain Bustamonte. Recognizing him to be the brother of the border patrolman his henchmen had murdered several months earlier, Ochoa resolves to kill the Miguel as well. Francisco manages to intervene, saving Miguel, and allows El Graduado to be taken in by the authorities. Afterward, Sheriff Bustamonte's opinion of El Gato Negro changes for the better but he continues to hunt for the hero regardless, believing his methods to be dangerous.

Enter: The Dogs of War
In retaliation, the Annulus enlists the aid of Boss Ochoa's nephews, two ruthless mercenaries from Corpus Christi, Texas. Nearly killing the costumed-crimefighter, El Gato Negro manages to escape from the two, only to collapse in the arms of his grandfather, Agustin Guerrero, suffering from extreme fatigue and near-intracranial injury.

Graphic Novel
Shortly after the publishing the fourth issue of El Gato Negro, the series went on hiatus for seven years, ending the series with a cliffhanger. El Gato Negro later returned in 2005 in the new on-going series El Gato Negro: Nocturnal Warrior #1. There are currently plans to release a graphic novel compilation of the series, including the unpublished fifth issue.

In other media
Deadline reported that MGM Television is developing a live-action TV series adaptation of El Gato Negro titled El Gato Negro: Nocturnal Warrior with Diego Boneta starring as Francisco Guerrero and will also executive produce under his production company, Three Amigos while Joel Novoa will co-executive produce. The Hollywood Reporter has reported that the series is picked by Apple TV+ and Robert Rodriguez will direct the pilot and executive produce the series as well

See also
El Gato Negro

References

External links
Official site
Dominguez Illustrations

Publications established in 1993
Professional wrestling comics